Bělá is a municipality and village in Opava District in the Moravian-Silesian Region of the Czech Republic. It has about 700 inhabitants. It is part of the historic Hlučín Region.

History
The first written mention of Bělá is from 1349.

During the World War II, the German occupiers operated the E116 forced labour subcamp of the Stalag VIII-B/344 prisoner-of-war camp in the village.

References

External links

Villages in Opava District
Hlučín Region